Letung Airport  is a domestic airport located on Jemaja Island of Anambas Islands Regency, Riau Islands province. It serves the island. Letung Airport is able to serve aircraft equivalent to ATR 72.

Airlines and destinations

Statistics

References

Airports in the Riau Islands